Bernat Jaume (born 19 November 1995 in Igualada) is a Spanish professional squash player. As of August 2022, he was ranked number 50 in the world.

References

1995 births
Living people
Spanish male squash players